Sydney Thompson may refer to:

 Sydney Thompson (musician), British bandleader
 Sydney Thompson (politician) (1906–1994), Australian politician
 Sydney Herbert Thompson (1920–1997), Canadian politician
 Sydney Thompson (artist) (1877–1973), New Zealand artist
 Sydney Mary Thompson (1847–1923), Irish geologist, botanist and artist
 Sydney Thompson (footballer) (born 1892), English footballer